"The Come Back" is a 1953 song by Memphis Slim. It was one of his signature R&B chart hits.

References

1953 songs
Memphis Slim songs